"True Hearts" (stylized as "TRUE HEARTS") is the second single by Shouta Aoi, released on August 6, 2014.

Background and release

"True Hearts" is Shouta Aoi's second single released under his current stage name.

The single was released on August 6, 2014 under the B-green label, along with the B-side "Burning Magic (BurniMagi)." Along with the regular edition, two limited edition versions of the single were released with alternate covers and DVD exclusives.  The limited edition A version's DVD exclusive contains the music video for "True Hearts" and making-of footage, while the limited edition B's version includes a digest video for Aoi's first concert, Shouta Aoi 1st Live: Virginal.

Reception
"True Hearts" reached #13 on the Oricon Weekly Singles Chart and charted for 6 weeks. The song also debuted at #20 on the Billboard Japan Hot 100.

Track listing

Charts

Notes

References

2014 singles
2014 songs
Japanese-language songs